Mayr is a German surname. Notable people with the surname include:

 Andrea Mayr (born 1979), Austrian female long-distance runner
 Ernst Mayr (1904–2005), German American evolutionary biologist
 Georg Mayr (1564–1623), Bavarian Jesuit priest and Hebrew grammarian
 Gustav Mayr (1830–1908), Austrian entomologist
 Hans Mayr (canoeist) (born 1944), Austrian sprint canoer
 Hans Mayr (trade unionist) (1921–2009), German trades unionist and politician
 Hans Mayr, founder of the shoemaking company Ed Meier, Munich
 Heinz Mayr (born 1935), German racewalker
 Karl Mayr (1883–1945), German politician and officer
 Michael Mayr (1864–1922), Austrian historian, politician and Bundeskanzler (1920/21)
 Rupert Ignaz Mayr (1646–1712), German composer
 Simon Mayr (1763–1845), German composer
 Simon Marius (1573–1624), Simon Mayr in German, German astronomer
 Stephanie Mayr (born 1965), German curler

See also
Mayr-Melnhof AG, a Vienna-based company
Mayr-Harting
Maior (disambiguation)
Mayer (disambiguation)
Meyr (disambiguation)
Meyer (disambiguation)
Meier
Meir (disambiguation)

German-language surnames
Jewish surnames
Yiddish-language surnames